Taimali is a railway station on the Taiwan Railways Administration South-link line located in Taimali Township, Taitung County, Taiwan.

History
The station was opened on 1 January 1988.

See also
 List of railway stations in Taiwan

References

1988 establishments in Taiwan
Railway stations in Taitung County
Railway stations opened in 1988
Railway stations served by Taiwan Railways Administration